Luxury may refer to:
Luxury goods, an economic good or service for which demand increases more than proportionally as income rises
Luxury tax, tax on products not considered essential, such as expensive cars
Luxury tax (sports), surcharge put on the aggregate payroll of a sports team to the extent to which it exceeds a predetermined guideline level set by the league
Luxury car, expensive automobiles
Luxury train, expensive tourist trains
Luxury yacht, expensive privately owned, professionally crewed yacht
Luxury apartment, a type of property that is intended to provide its occupant with higher-than-average levels of comfort, quality and convenience
Luxury hotel, high-quality amenities, full-service accommodations and the highest level of personalized services
Luxury resort, exclusive vacation facilities
Luxury box, term for a special seating section in arenas, stadiums and other sports venues
Luxury magazine, magazines devoted to fine craft and luxury goods

Music 

Luxury (Georgia band), rock band from Toccoa, Georgia
Luxury (Iowa band), a power pop rock music band from Des Moines, Iowa
Luxury (Fantastic Plastic Machine album), 1998
Luxury (The Nein album), 2007